Marienthal may refer to:

Places

Germany
Marienthal (Geisenheim), a quarter of Geisenheim, Hesse
Marienthal, Hamburg, a quarter in the Wandsbek borough of Hamburg
A part of Zehdenick, Brandenburg
A part of Rockenhausen, Rhineland-Palatinate
A part of Zwickau, Saxony

Elsewhere 
Basilique Notre-Dame de Marienthal, a locality of Haguenau, France
Marienthal, Saskatchewan, a hamlet in Rural Municipality of Cambria No. 6, Canada
Marienthal, Luxembourg
Mariental, Namibia
Marienthal, Eastern Cape, Amahlathi Local Municipality, South Africa
Marienthal, Kansas, United States
Marienthal Park, part of the Pavlovsk Palace, Saint Petersburg, Russia

People with the surname
Eli Marienthal (born 1986),  American actor
Eric Marienthal (born 1957), American saxophonist
Mike Marienthal (1923–2013), American basketballer

See also
Mariental (disambiguation)
St. Marienthal Abbey